This list of North Carolina Agricultural and Technical State University alumni includes graduates, non-graduate former students, and current students of North Carolina Agricultural and Technical State University (N.C. A&T), a public, coeducational, high research activity, land-grant university, located in Greensboro, North Carolina, United States.

North Carolina A&T is one of 16 public universities that constitute the University of North Carolina System, and one of the first public universities in the United States. Founded in 1891 as the "Agricultural and Mechanical college for the Colored Race," N.C. A&T was the first land grant college for people of color in the state of North Carolina. Over the 100 plus years of the university's existence, the academic scope expanded to encompass other disciplines. The North Carolina General Assembly redefined N.C. A&T as a regional university and through legislation made it a member of the University of North Carolina System in 1971.

As of 2014, North Carolina A&T has about 40,000 living alumni.

Alumni

Education

Science and Technology

Civics

Civil rights

Corporate and business

Arts and entertainment

Military

Athletics

Miscellaneous

Notes

 Al Attles Graduated from N.C. A&T with both a B.A. in History and a B.S. in Physical Education.
 Franklin McCain received bachelor's degrees in both biology and chemistry from A&T in 1964.

References

North Carolina Agricultural and Technical State University alumni